Tales from the Lakeside is a 2017 Hungarian animated adventure fantasy family film written and directed by Zsolt Pálfi. The film stars András Faragó, Anna Kubik and Tamás Markovics in the lead roles. The film was released on 27 April 2017 and received positive reviews from critics. The film also received several awards and nominations in international film festivals. Its sequel Willy and the Guardians of the Lake was released on 6 December 2018 and received positive reviews.

Synopsis 
The green Verdies are small and minute, but yet are courageous guardians of the lakeside. Verdies only become guardians when they reach an age in which their hair turns brown in colour and until then life is boring. The green haired youngsters are not allowed to fly on warblers to row boats alone along the lake or even to ride wild frogs at the rodeo.

Cast 

 András Faragó
 Anna Kubik
 Tamás Markovics
 Csongor Szalay
 Péter Bercsényi
 Róbert Bolla

Awards and nominations

References

External links 

 

2017 films
2010s Hungarian-language films
Hungarian animated films
Hungarian fantasy films
2017 animated films
2010s fantasy adventure films